Ledeno doba is the fifth studio album by Serbian garage rock/punk rock band Partibrejkers, released by ZMEX in 1997.

Track listing 
All tracks written by Zoran Kostić Srdjan Graovac and Nebojša Antonijević.

Personnel 
Partibrejkers
 Nebojša Antonijević "Anton" — guitar, mixed by, producer
 Zoran Kostić "Cane" — vocals
 Gojko Ševar — bass
 Srđan Graovac — guitar, backing vocals
 Darko Kurjak — drums

Additional personnel
 Dušan Kojić "Koja" — producer, mixed by, bass on track 4. 2nd part
 Sandra Stojanović — recorded by, backing vocals
 Igor Borojević — recorded by, mixed by
 Jelena Petrović — flute
 "Pera Joe" Miladinović — harmonica
 Saša Lokner — keyboards
 Vladan Miljković "Milje" — saxophone
 Bora Veličković — trumpet
 Marin Petrić "Puroni" — percussion
 Klipa — backing vocals
 Srđan Gojković "Gile" — backing vocals
 Branislav Petrović "Banana" — backing vocals
 Maja Stanojević — artwork by [booklet design], photography [color]
 Stanislav Milojković — photography [black & white]

References

External links
 Ledeno doba at Discogs

1997 albums
Partibrejkers albums